The Trouble with Spies is a 1987 film written and directed by Burt Kennedy. A spy spoof comedy, it stars Donald Sutherland and Ned Beatty.

The film was shot in 1984, but not released until three years later. It features veteran actress Ruth Gordon's final performances. It was also the final film of Suzanne Danielle.

Plot
When secret agent George Trent goes missing, spy agency chief Angus sends inept colleague Appleton Porter to the isle of Ibiza to find out why.

Appleton meets a number of guests in Mona Lewis's hotel who were familiar with Trent, but none has a clue what became of him. Appleton himself is totally clueless, nearly being killed a number of times but surviving mainly due to pure dumb luck.

Cast
Donald Sutherland as Appleton Porter
Ned Beatty as Harry Lewis
Ruth Gordon as Mrs. Arkwright
Lucy Gutteridge as Mona
Michael Hordern as Jason Locke
Suzanne Danielle as Maria Sola
Robert Morley as Angus
Gregory Sierra as Captain Sanchez

Production
The film was financed entirely by Home Box Office, the first production of the pay cable channel’s new theatrical motion picture division. the film, initially titled Trouble at the Royal Rose, was greenlit in the Spring of 1983 and the film had a $6-million budget.

Michael Caine was initially offered $1 million to play the role of Appleton Porter However, Caine turned down the role and actor Donald Sutherland took the part instead.

Home media
After limited theatrical release HBO Video issued The Trouble With Spies on VHS. It was never released on DVD or Blu-ray.

References

External links

1987 films
1980s spy films
Films directed by Burt Kennedy
Films set in Ibiza
HBO Films films
De Laurentiis Entertainment Group films
1987 comedy films
Films scored by Ken Thorne
1980s English-language films